Carolyn Whitney Branagan (born 1954) is an American Republican politician who was elected and served in the Vermont House of Representatives and Vermont Senate. She represented the Franklin-1 Representative District in the House and Franklin County for the Senate.

She did not seek reelection in 2018, and retired in 2019.

References

1954 births
21st-century American women politicians
Living people
Republican Party members of the Vermont House of Representatives
Women state legislators in Vermont
21st-century American politicians